Abhi Sridharan Vaidehi, better known by his stage name Abhi the Nomad, is an Indian rapper and singer associated with hip hop music. To date, Vaidehi has released three full-length albums, Marbled, Modern Trash, and, most recently, Abhi vs The Universe, as well as six extended plays.

Personal life 
Vaidehi was born in Madras, India to a diplomat father who was frequently forced to travel. He currently lives in Austin, Texas. Of his heritage, Vaidehi stated in an interview with the Chicago Sun-Times "I’m not really complaining — being Indian’s actually almost an advantage... but it’d be cool if a lot of Indians were prominent in hip-hop. They’re not, and I don’t know why." In addition to India, Vaidehi has resided in China, Hong Kong, France, the Fiji Islands and the United States. He describes a childhood memory of him being pedaled to kindergarten in the rear compartment of a cycle rickshaw. The events of Vaidehi's childhood heavily influenced his name,  'Nomad' meaning a person without a fixed habitat.

Some of Vaidehi's earliest musical influences included Blink-182 and Linkin Park. He later found himself fascinated with the music of Chicago rapper Kanye West, whom he has described as his gateway into hip-hop music. Of his introduction to the genre, Vaidehi stated "Ye got me into hip-hop, and Jay kept me coming back."

When Vaidehi was in high school, he was struck by a taxi cab. As he later explained in a behind-the-scenes video in which he explained the making of his song "Extra Life", he "flew twenty feet in the air, landed, and... when I opened my eyes, my vision was blurry, 'cause my glasses flew off, and they were actually like five feet away from me. And a truck ran over them and crushed them right in front of my eyes. I'm not even making this shit up." Vaidehi survived the incident and seemingly made a full recovery.

During the 2020 presidential election primary campaign season, Vaidehi promoted Democratic candidate Bernie Sanders by releasing a video on his YouTube channel featuring live, acoustic versions of his songs "Jungle", "So Long", and "Hello Stranger".

Career 
Vaidehi has released three full-length albums, Marbled, Modern Trash, and, most recently, Abhi vs The Universe on September 12, 2021, as well as six extended plays, Beginning, Catharsis, Where Are My Friends, Abhi Vs Kato with producer Kato, Abhi vs the Universe (Acoustic), and Abhi vs Kato II: Gold Standard with Kato. Of all of the songs in his expansive discography, more than half are collaborations. Some of Vaidehi's most frequent collaborators are Khary, Harrison Sands, Sherm, and Foster Cazz.

In December 2021, nearly three months after the release of Abhi vs the Universe, a deluxe edition of the album was released on all platforms.

On 3 August 2022, Vaidehi announced a twenty-stop tour entitled Abhi the Nomad: Universe Tour. The tour ran for just over two months from 18 September 2022, to 20 November 2022, and saw support from singer-songwriter and TikTok inflencer Charlie Curtis-Beard.

On 6 January 2023, Vaidehi announced on Twitter and his Discord server that a second EP with Kato on the Track, Abhi vs Kato II: Gold Standard, (which would serve as a sequel to 2020's Abhi vs Kato) was in progress. The upcoming work’s first single, entitled “Gordon Ramsay”, was released on January 27. The album’s tracklist was released on February 22, and the EP was released on February 24.

Discography

Studio albums/extended plays

References

External links 
 
 

Living people
People from Chennai
Indian emigrants to the United States
American male singers of Indian descent
American people of Indian Tamil descent
21st-century American male musicians
21st-century American rappers
American rappers of Asian descent
1993 births